DokeV is a creature-collecting open world action-adventure game that is currently being developed by Pearl Abyss. The game revolves around characters who find Dokebi, creatures that gain strength from people's dreams, and embark on adventures together.

Development 
DokeV is currently being developed with Pearl Abyss founder Daeil Kim as Executive Producer and Sangyoung Kim, who was a lead Black Desert animator, as lead producer.

History 

On November 7, 2019, DokeV’s title was revealed for the first time.

The next week on November 14, 2019, DokeV’s official announcement trailer was revealed for the first time at Pearl Abyss Connect 2019, which took place at G-STAR 2019 in South Korea. The next month on December 5, 2019, the reveal trailer's original soundtrack ROCKSTAR and accompanying lyric video, as well as new screenshot, were revealed.

On August 25, 2021, DokeV’s first gameplay trailer made its world premiere at Gamescom: Opening Night Live.

OST 
The trailer's original K-pop song “ROCKSTAR” is composed by ITZY’s “Dalla Dalla” composer 별들의전쟁 * (GALACTIKA *).

References

External links 

 Official Site

Upcoming video games
Action-adventure games
Open-world video games
Video games developed in South Korea
Virtual pets
Windows games
Pearl Abyss games